Michel Gratton may refer to:
 Michel Gratton (journalist), press secretary to former Canadian prime minister Brian Mulroney
 Michel Gratton (politician), member of the National Assembly of Quebec